Heterolocha coccinea is a moth in the family Geometridae first described by Inoue in 1976. It is found in Taiwan.

The wingspan is 23–29 mm.

References

Moths described in 1976
Ourapterygini
Moths of Japan